Reginald Clifford Allen, 1st Baron Allen of Hurtwood (9 May 1889 – 3 March 1939), known as Clifford Allen, was a British politician, leading member of the Independent Labour Party (ILP), and prominent pacifist.

Early life and education
The son of Walter Allen, a draper, Reginald Clifford Allen was born in Newport, then in Monmouthshire in Wales. The family later moved to Bristol, on account of Walter's business. Allen was educated at Berkhamsted School, University College, Bristol and, from 1908 to 1911, at Peterhouse, Cambridge. Having initially identified as a Conservative, in his final year at Cambridge he was chair of the university's Fabian Society.

Career
Shortly after coming down from Cambridge with a third-class degree, he was made Secretary and then General Manager of the Daily Citizen between 1911 and 1915. He was Chairman of the No-Conscription Fellowship in the First World War, and was imprisoned as a conscientious objector three times. In 1917 he became so ill that he was released from prison where he set up house with Catherine Marshall who was also ill from overwork. Marshall hoped that their relationship would continue but Allen ended their partnership.

After the war he was Treasurer and Chairman of the Independent Labour Party between 1922 and 1926, Chairman of the New Leader between 1922 and 1926 and director of the Daily Herald between 1925 and 1930.

He was raised to the peerage as Baron Allen of Hurtwood, of Hurtwood in the County of Surrey, on 18 January 1932, to boost Prime Minister Ramsay MacDonald's National Labour representation in the House of Lords. In 1934 he co-founded the Next Five Years Group seeking a progressive centre-left re-alignment in British politics.

In January 1935 Allen wrote of German dictator Adolf Hitler after he had met him:  
Despite his championing of the cause of appeasement, he strongly condemned Nazi brutality and anti-semitism. For instance, in the House of Lords in July 1938 he declared: 
 
His efforts to intercede with the German government trying to save Hans Litten, a prominent opponent of the Nazi regime, from Dachau concentration camp were however unsuccessful.

Personal life

Clifford Allen married Marjory Gill on 17 December 1921. They had one child, a daughter born in 1922, Joan Collete, known as Polly. Never having fully recovered from the privations of his imprisonment during the First World War when he had contracted tuberculosis, Lord Allen of Hurtwood died in a sanatorium in Switzerland in 1939, aged 49, the peerage becoming extinct.

Publications
Is Germany right and Britain wrong?, Chelsea : London : s.n., 1914.
Executive committee report to the members on the progress of the fellowship, No-Conscription Fellowship. London : No-Conscription Fellowship, 1915.
Presidential address by Clifford Allen to the National Convention of the No-Conscription Fellowship, 27 November 1915, No-Conscription Fellowship. London : National Labour Press, 1916.
Why I still resist: Leaflet (No-Conscription Fellowship), no. 5., No-Conscription Fellowship, Pelican Press, London : Printed for the No-Conscription Fellowship, 1917.
Putting socialism into practice : the President address, London : Independent Labour Party, 1924.
The I.L.P. and Revolution ... Reprinted from the Socialist Review., London : I.L.P. Publication Dept., 1925.
Socialism & the next Labour Government. The presidential address ... at the I.L.P. Annual Conference, 1925.,Independent Labour Party: London, 1925.
Labour's Future at Stake, London : G. Allen & Unwin, 1932.
Britain's political future; a plea for liberty and leadership, London, New York [etc.] Longmans, Green, 1934.
Effective pacifism, London : League of Nations Union, 1934.
The next five years : an essay in political agreement, with W Arnold Forster; A Barratt Brown; et al. London : Macmillan, 1935.
We did not fight : 1914-18 experiences of war resisters, edited by Julian Bell ; with a foreword by H.R.L. Sheppard ; contrib. by Lord Allen of Hurtwood ... [et al.]. London, 1935.
Peace in Our Time. An appeal to the International Peace Conference of June 16, 1936. London : Chatto & Windus, 1936.
The price of European peace, with Frank Ongley Darvall; Jan Christiaan Smuts. London [u.a.] : Hodge, 1937.

References

Further reading
David Boulton: Objection Overruled, Macgibbon & Kee, 1967
Martin Gilbert: "Plough My Own Furrow: The Story of Lord Allen of Hurtwood as told through his own writings and correspondence", London: Longmans, 1965
Thomas C Kennedy: The hound of conscience : a history of the No-Conscription Fellowship, 1914-1919, Fayetteville : University of Arkansas Press, 1981 
Arthur Marwick: Clifford Allen: The Open Conspirator, Oliver & Boyd, 1964

External links
 Hansard 1803–2005: contributions in Parliament by or in reference to Lord Allen of Hurtwood
 Obituary in The Spectator, dated 10 March 1939
 Page at Spartacus
 Entry at Dictionary of National Biography
 

Allen of Hurtwood, Reginald Allen, 1st Baron
Allen of Hurtwood, Reginald Allen, 1st Baron
Anglican pacifists
Allen of Hurtwood, Reginald Clifford Allen, 1st Baron
British conscientious objectors
British anti–World War I activists
Independent Labour Party National Administrative Committee members
Members of the Executive of the Labour and Socialist International
Members of the Fabian Society
National Labour (UK) politicians
People educated at Berkhamsted School
Barons created by George V